Lydia Casey Jele (née Mashila; born 22 June 1990) is a Botswana athlete competing primarily in the 400 metres. She participated in the relay at the 2013 World Championships without qualifying for the final.  She ran the 400 meters at the 2016 Summer Olympics.  She qualified by winning the Botswana Athletics Association Championships.

Her personal bests are 11.51 in the 100 metres, 24.55 in the 200 metres (-0.1 m/s, Shenzhen 2011) and 52.65 in the 400 metres (Porto Novo 2012). Jele is a Latter-day Saint.

Competition record

References

External links
 

1990 births
Living people
Botswana female sprinters
Botswana Latter Day Saints
Commonwealth Games competitors for Botswana
Athletes (track and field) at the 2010 Commonwealth Games
Athletes (track and field) at the 2015 African Games
World Athletics Championships athletes for Botswana
Athletes (track and field) at the 2016 Summer Olympics
Olympic athletes of Botswana
African Games silver medalists for Botswana
African Games medalists in athletics (track and field)
Competitors at the 2013 Summer Universiade
Competitors at the 2011 Summer Universiade
Olympic female sprinters